Lawrence McClure (June 26, 1987) is an American politician who is a member of the Florida House of Representatives. He was elected in a special election in December 2017. He represents the Plant City area.

In 2022, he sponsored a bill that would have ended net metering and allowed Florida electric utilities to impose steep bills on those who install solar panels on their buildings. The proposed legislation was vetoed by Governor Ron DeSantis. McClure subsequently said he intended to propose a revised version of the bill.

References

External links
Florida House of Representatives - Lawrence McClure

Republican Party members of the Florida House of Representatives
Living people
21st-century American politicians
1987 births